Daniel Gordon Stuart (born March 5, 1961, Los Angeles) is an American musician and author best known as the lead singer of the rock band Green on Red (other members included Chuck Prophet, Chris Cacavas and Jack Waterson), his teaming with Steve Wynn as Danny & Dusty, a trilogy of "Marlowe Billings" solo records released from 2012 - 2018 and three novels, The Deliverance of Marlowe Billings (2014), The Unfortunate Demise of Marlowe Billings (2018) and Marlowe's Revenge (2022).

History
Raised in Tucson, Arizona, Dan Stuart founded punk band The Serfers in 1979. The next year the band moved to LA, changed the name to Green On Red, and became associated with the paisley underground (along with Rain Parade and The Dream Syndicate). After releasing two EPs, the band recorded their first full album, Gravity Talks for Slash Records in 1983. Green On Red toured America and Europe extensively and released eight more records before disbanding in 1992. In that time, Stuart worked with producers Jim Dickinson, Glyn Johns, and Al Kooper.

Danny & Dusty recorded and released The Lost Weekend album in 1985.

After Green On Red, Stuart recorded the album Retronuevo with Al Perry in 1993, and solo effort Can O'Worms in 1995, before largely leaving the music business.

He would return for a Green On Red reunion in 2006, and a second Danny & Dusty record, Cast Iron Soul in 2007.

The Slummers, a band he started with producer JD Foster, released Love Of The Amateur, produced by Italian guitar player/composer Antonio Gramentieri, in 2010.

Stuart released a second solo album, The Deliverance of Marlowe Billings, summer 2012.

Dan Stuart, Arizona: 1993-95, a double cd featuring Can O'Worms and Retronuevo plus a never released EP was released in 2013.

The Deliverance of Marlowe Billings  is also the title of "a false memoir" written by Stuart and published in 2014.

Stuart released a third solo album, Marlowe's Revenge, recorded with Mexican band Twin Tones in 2015, mixed by JD Foster, and released February 2016.

Summer 2018, Stuart released The Unfortunate Demise of Marlowe Billings, recorded with producer/guitarist Danny Amis (Los Straitjackets, Raybeats). The record is a companion piece to a novel of the same name.

Stuart is currently residing in Tucson, AZ after nearly a decade in Mexico.

The third and final novel in the Marlowe trilogy Marlowe's Revenge - October 2022.

Discography
Green On Red
Two Bibles (EP, Green on Red, 1981)
Green on Red (EP, Down There, 1982)
Gravity Talks (Slash, 1983)
Gas Food Lodging (Enigma, 1985)
No Free Lunch (EP, Mercury, 1985)
The Killer Inside Me (Mercury, 1987)
Here Come the Snakes (Restless, 1989)
This Time Around (Mercury, 1989)
Scapegoats (China, 1991)
The Little Things in Life (China Records 1991)
Too Much Fun (Off Beat, 1992)
Archives: What We Were Thinking (Normal Records, 1998)
Valley Fever — Live at the Rialto (Blue Rose, 2006)
BBC Sessions (Maida Vale Records, 2007)
Danny & Dusty
The Lost Weekend (A&M, 1985)
Cast Iron Soul (Blue Rose, 2007)
Here's To You, Max Morlock (Blue Rose 2007)
Al Perry & Dan Stuart
Retronuevo (Normal,1993)
The Slummers
Love of The Amateur (Blue Rose, 2010)
Dan Stuart
Can O'Worms (Monkey Hill, 1995)
Dan Stuart - 4 Songs (Padre Lindo, 2011)
The Deliverance of Marlowe Billings  (Cadiz Music, 2012)
Arizona : 1993-95 (Cadiz Music, 2013)
A little Guitar...and a little more (Padre Lindo, 2015)
Marlowe's Revenge (Fluff and Gravy Records, 2016)
The Unfortunate Demise of Marlowe Billings - record + novel (Cadiz Music, 2018)

Bibliography

Novels
 The Deliverance of Marlowe Billings (Cadiz Music, 2014)
 The Unfortunate Demise of Marlowe Billings (Cadiz Music, 2018)
 Marlowe's Revenge (R&R Press, 2022)

Poetry
 Barcelona Blues (Padre Lindo Press, 2014)

References

External links 
Dan Stuart : Official Site
Green On Red : Official Site
Robert Christgau: CG: Green on Red
Danny And Dusty Play It Loose - Los Angeles Times
The Pop Life; In Green on Red's New 'Killer,' A Nod To Film Noir - New York Times
Dan Stuart interview

Blabber 'N' Smoke
Dan Stuart interview
Dan Stuart Interview August 2013
Arizona 1993-95
Glide Magazine - New Album 2016
Houston Chronicle July 2018
Jim Algie www.jimalgie.club Nov 22 2019

Living people
1961 births
American male singer-songwriters
American rock songwriters
American rock singers
Musicians from Tucson, Arizona
American rock guitarists
American male guitarists
Guitarists from Arizona
20th-century American guitarists
20th-century American male musicians
Tucson
Singer-songwriters from Arizona
Green on Red members